William Joseph Roberts (March 13, 1925 – January 23, 2016) was an American professional basketball player. He was born in Fort Wayne, Indiana.

He was awarded a varsity letter to play college basketball for the Wyoming Coyboys for the 1945–46, helping the team to a Mountain States Athletic Conference (MSAC) conference title and an NCAA tournament appearance.  The Cowboys were 22-4 with a MSAC record of 10-2. His Basketball Association of America (BAA) and National Basketball Association (NBA) career lasted from 1948 to 1950.

After his playing retirement, Roberts worked for Reynolds Aluminium in McCook, Illinois, until 1973. He relocated to Indiana and opened a confectionery store with his wife. Roberts returned to Illinois and settled in DeKalb, where he died on January 23, 2016.

BAA/NBA career statistics

Regular season

Playoffs

References

External links

1925 births
2016 deaths
American men's basketball players
Basketball players from Fort Wayne, Indiana
Boston Celtics players
Centers (basketball)
Chicago Stags players
Professional Basketball League of America players
St. Louis Bombers (NBA) players
Wyoming Cowboys basketball players